Kainbach bei Graz is a municipality in the district of Graz-Umgebung in the Austrian state of Styria.

Geography
Kainbach lies about 5 km east of Graz in the east Styrian hills.

References

Cities and towns in Graz-Umgebung District